As Samu' or es-Samu' is a town in the Hebron Governorate of the West Bank, Palestine, 12 kilometers south of the city of Hebron and 60 kilometers southwest of Jerusalem.

Geography
The area is a hilly, rocky area cut by some wadis. The Armistice Demarcation Line (ADL, Green line) runs generally east to west approximately five kilometers south of as-Samu'. The village of as-Samu' is located on twin hills with a wadi varying from shallow to deep between them. According to the Palestinian Central Bureau of Statistics the town had a population of 19,649 in 2007.

History

Ancient period

As-Samu' is built upon a tell identified with Eshtemoa, an ancient Judahite and later Jewish settlement mentioned in various historical sources.

In 1971, five pottery jars dated to the 9th-8th centuries BCE were found in as-Samu', bearing inscriptions written in the Paleo-Hebrew alphabet. These jars contained one of the largest silver hoards ever found in Israel and the Palestinian Territories.

Classical period 
In the 4th-century CE, Eshtemoa was described by Eusebius in his Onomasticon as a large Jewish village. The Jerusalem Talmud mentions Eshtemoa as the place of residence of an amora (scholar) who dwelt in the town during the 4th century by the name of Hasa of Eshtemoa.

In 1934, the remains of an ancient Jewish synagogue, now known as the Eshtemoa synagogue, were unearthed at as-Samu'. The synagogue is dated to around the 4th–5th century CE. Four seven-branched menorahs were discovered carved onto door lintels and one of them is displayed in Jerusalem's Rockefeller Museum. Beginning in the seventh century, the structure served as a mosque.

Middle Ages
What was earlier identified to be part of a 12th-century Crusaders tower, turned out to be a 4th-century synagogue, which was turned into a mosque at the time of Saladin, according to tradition.

Ottoman era

As-Samu' was incorporated into the Ottoman Empire in 1517, and in the census of 1596 the village appeared  as being in the Nahiya of Halil of the Liwa of Quds. It had a population of 16 households, all Muslim. They paid a fixed tax-rate of 33,3% on agricultural products, including  wheat, barley, vineyards and fruit trees, in addition to occasional revenues, goats and bee-hives; a total of 3000 akçe.

In 1838, Edward Robinson identified the town of Semua with biblical Eshtemoa. He described As-Samu  as a  "considerable" village..."full of  flocks and herds all in fine order". He also found remains of walls built from very large stones, some of which were more than 10 feet long. In 1863 the French explorer Victor Guérin visited the place.

An Ottoman village list from about 1870 found that as-Samu had a population of 298, in 77 houses, though the population count included men, only.

In 1883, the Palestine Exploration Fund's  Survey of Western Palestine described it as "A village of moderate size, standing high.
On the north is an open valley, and the modern buildings extend along a spur which runs out west from the watershed. The ground is rocky
on the hills, but the valleys are arable land. There are remains of an ancient castle in the village, and other fragments. A church is said once
to have existed here, and the ruins to the west show that the town was once much larger. To the south there are olives in the valley. To the north there are rock-cut tombs on the hill-side ; the water-supply is from cisterns. The inhabitants number some 400 to 500 souls.

British Mandate era
In the  1922 census of Palestine conducted  by the British Mandate authorities,  As-Samu (called: AI Samu)  had an entirely Muslim population of 1,600 inhabitants. In the 1931 census, As-Samu, together with Khirbat al-Simia and Kh. Rafat had a total of 1,882 Muslims,  in 372 houses.
In 1934, remains of the towns ancient synagogue were discovered and the site was later excavated in 1969, by Ze'ev Yeivin.

In  the 1945 statistics the population of as-Samu' was 2,520, all Muslims, who owned 138,872 dunams of land  according to an official land and population survey.  30 dunams were plantations and irrigable land, 40,398 for cereals, while 165 dunams were built-up (urban) land.

Jordanian era
In the wake of the 1948 Arab–Israeli War and the 1949 Armistice Agreements, As-Samu was annexed by Jordan along with the rest of the renamed ‘West Bank’. In 1961, the population of Samu was  3,103.

Samu Incident 

In 1966 Israel launched a full-scale military operation against the town, which resulted in the deaths of fifteen Jordanian soldiers and three Jordanian civilians; fifty-four other soldiers were wounded. The villagers suffered 3 civilians killed and 96 wounded. According to David Dean Shulman, the villagers were unconnected to the incident that had triggered the reprisal. Much of the village was destroyed. The commander of the Israeli paratroop battalion, Colonel Yoav Shaham, was killed and ten other Israeli soldiers were wounded.

Israeli occupation
As a result of the Six-Day War in 1967, 'as-Samu came under Israeli occupation. The population in the 1967 census conducted by the Israeli authorities was 3,784. Under the Oslo Accords, the town was assigned to Area A.

It was reported in 2005 that 10,000 dunums of land in the towns of 'as-Samu, Yatta and ad-Dhahiriya near Hebron were to be seized by the Israel Defense Forces for the construction of the separation wall. Palestinian sources have alleged that settler violence from the nearby Israeli settlements of Ma'on and Asa'el has prevented them from accessing their fields.

Culture
A headdress or 'money hat' (wuqayat al-darahem) from as-Samu (c. 1840s, with later additions) is exhibited at the British Museum. The caption notes that the headdress was worn in the 19th century and early 20th century during the wedding ceremony, especially for the 'going out to the well' ceremony when the bride appeared in public as a married woman for the first time. Generally, the headdress was considered to be one of the most important parts of the Palestinian costume.

As-Samu' is also known for its handwoven kilims.

See also
 Eshtemoa synagogue

References

Bibliography

Ben-Yehûdā, Ḥ. and Sandler, Shmuel (2002). The Arab-Israeli Conflict Transformed: Fifty Years of Interstate and Ethnic Crises. SUNY Press. 
   
Chen, S.:  The Design of the Ancient Synagogues in Judaea: Eshtemoa and Horvat Susiya
 
 (p. 972)

 
  

 

Hussein of Jordan (1969). My "War" with Israel. London: Peter Owen. 

 
Oren, M. (2002). Six Days of War. Oxford University Press. 

 
Prittie, Terence (1969). Eshkol of Israel: The Man and the Nation.  London, Museum Press. 
 (p. 312)

External links
Welcome To The City of al-Samu'
Samu’a, Welcome to Palestine
Survey of Western Palestine, Map 25:  IAA, Wikimedia commons 
Samu’a, Ta'ayush
As Samu' Town (Fact Sheet), Applied Research Institute–Jerusalem (ARIJ)
As Samu' Town Profile, ARIJ
As Samu'  aerial photo, ARIJ
The priorities and needs for development in As Samu' town based on the community and local authorities’ assessment, ARIJ

Cities in the West Bank
Hebron Governorate
Ancient Jewish settlements of Judaea
13 Kohanic cities
Municipalities of the State of Palestine